Rogale  is a village in the administrative district of Gmina Stare Juchy, within Ełk County, Warmian-Masurian Voivodeship, in northern Poland.

The village was historically German, being part of Prussia since the 12th century. However, after World War II the entire area of East Prussia
was given to Poland, and the inhabitants of the village were subsequently forced out of their homes/native lands and sent to land still part of post WW2 Germany, with Poles being sent to settle the area in the Germans place.

References

Villages in Ełk County